Idrija ( or , , Venetian Slovene dialect Juruda) is a border river between Slovenia and Italy. It separates the Gorizia Hills from the Slavia Friulana. It emerges under the Kolovrat ridge and flows southwest towards Friuli where it joins the Torre. The river was historically important as separating the Republic of Venice from the Habsburg Lands, Italy from Austria-Hungary, and since 1947 Italy from Yugoslavia.

References

Border rivers
Rivers of the Slovene Littoral
Rivers of Friuli-Venezia Giulia